Boramae Park Station is a station on Sillim Line. It is located in Sindaebang-dong, Dongjak-gu, Seoul.

Boramae Park (보라매공원)

Boramae Park is a famous public park in Dongjak-Gu, Seoul, a 10 minutes walk from Sindaebang Station. The park was constructed on the old site of the Korean Air Force Academy, which was taken over by the Seoul Metropolitan Government and developed into a recreational public park with several facilities and attractions. Boramae Park was renovated from December 20, 1985, and reopened on May 5, 1986, receiving its name from the Air Force Academy's signature tower, Boramae.

The imposing structure represents loyalty and filial piety.

Boramae Park, located in the southwestern area of Seoul, is popular among residents due to its proximity to Dongjak-gu, Gwanak-gu, and Yeongdeungpo-gu. In the spring, enjoy the lovely landscape of cherry blossoms and tulips, while in the autumn, admire the romantic hues of autumn leaves on a walk with loved ones. Summer is packed with water-themed activities for children and fountains, whilst winter is distinguished by snow-covered ponds.

At approximately 397,000 m2, the park holds various areas:
 Landscape facilities: lawn yard, hydroponic facilities, lotus pond, azalea garden, Mugunghwa garden, etc.
 Sports facilities: Jogging track, artificial grass soccer field, tennis court, multi-purpose playground, badminton court, artificial rock climbing field, gate ball field, acupressure sidewalk, Basketball court
 Convenience facilities: parking lot, canteen, drinking fountain, shade, toilet, bench
 Playground: Children's playground, floor fountain, theme water playground, air park
 Cultural facilities: Seoul Boramae Youth Center, Boramae Safety Experience Center, Dongjak-gu Community Center
 Other facilities: Seoul Gwanak Senior Welfare Center, Seoul Developmental Disabled Welfare Center, Seoul Southern Disabled Welfare Center, Dongjak Police Station District Grand Dispatch Center, etc.

Moreover, the 2nd floor of Building 4 has a library that is popular with teenagers as well as Teenager Center where they can enjoy various activities and programs. Enjoy airplane sculptures in the air park and bring your dog to the dog park for a day out.

Hydroponic Facilities open from May to September every year while the theme water playground operated for two months, from July to August.

Boramae Safety Experience Center (보라매안전체험관)

The Boramae Safety Experience Center, located within Boramae Park, offers an experience program focusing on disaster response. With a "Safe Seoul" goal, the center teaches safety awareness and safety measures through a 2-hour disaster simulation-based training program of one hour on how to confront disasters, earthquakes, windstorms, fire, and traffic accidents using a 4D movie. The activity is intended for kids from elementary to high school. The center also has a program wherein people can learn about first aid, such as CPR, and about how to use different safety facilities and equipment. It is closed on Mondays, New Year's Day, Seollal (Lunar New Year's Day), and Chuseok (Korean Thanksgiving Day)

Furthermore, there are a few facilities available within the Safety Experience Center:

B1F (Underground): Evaluation hall, orientation hall, 4D Theater, and subway accident experience zone.

1F (ground floor): Fire safety history museum, windstorm simulation zone, earthquake simulation zone.

2F (first floor): Traffic accident simulation zone, fire simulation zone.

3F (second floor): Practice fire safety facility, children's safety zone, emergency care practice room.

Major events
From March until June, the Central Lawn Square hosts the Children's Day Playground.
 Children's Day Pilot Experience Event  <<I'm the pilot of the future>> is hosted in the Air Park
 The operation of the fountains begins on May 1 and concludes on September 30th.
 The artificial rock climbing course is closed from December to March in order to prevent accidents.

ATTRACTIONS

중앙잔디광장 (Central lawn Square)

에어파크 (Air Park)

바닥분수 및 테마물놀이터 (Floor Fountain and Theme Water Playground)

음악분수 (Musical Fountain)

반려견 놀이터 (Pet playground)

맨발공원 (Barefoot Park)

인공암벽등반장 (Artificial rock climbing course is banned from using from December to March)

괴수원 (Mysterious garden)

인조잔디축구장 (Artificial turf soccer field)

PLANTS AND ANIMALS OF BORAMAE ECOLOGICAL SYSTEM

대모잠자리 (Dragonfly)

두꺼비 (Toad)

겹벚나무 [만첩개벗] (Cherry Blossom Tree)

히어리 (Corylopsis coreana)

바둑돌부전나비 (Lycaenidae butterfly)

애사슴벌레 (stag beetle)

파랑새 (blue bird)

연꽃 (lotus flower)

넓적배사마귀 (Hierodula patellifera mantis)

낙상홍 (Ilex serrata tree)

느티나무 (Japanese Zelkova tree)

흰말채나무 (Cornus alba tree)

신수유 (Japanese Cornus/ Cornus Officinalis)

청설모 (Eurasian Red Squirrel)

새호리기 (Falco Subbuteo bird)

청딱따구리 (Green woodpecker)

왕버들 (Salix chaenomeloides Kimura)

TRANSPORTATION

• Subway: -LINE 7, Boramae station, exit 2 (main gate in the direction of Boramae Park)

-LINE 2 Sindaebang Station, exit 4 ((heading toward Munchang Elementary School)

.Exit 1 of Boramae Hospital Station on the Sillim Line ) East gate of Boramae Park

• Bus:

-To the main entrance—> Take Maeul Village Bus-Dongjak (마을버스-동작)

Number 05 / 5531 / 5536 / 5623 / 5633 / 900 / 150 / 505 and get off at Boramae Park (보라매공원)

-To Boramae Park East Gate—> Take Maeul Village Bus-Dongjak (마을버스-동작)

Dongjak (동작) 05-1 / 153 / 5516 / 5525 and get off at Boramae Park (보라매공원) or Lotte Gwanak branch (롯데관악점)

References

 http://parks.seoul.go.kr/template/sub/boramae.do
 https://english.visitseoul.net/nature/Boramae-Park_/2190
 https://english.visitkorea.or.kr/enu/ATR/SI_EN_3_1_1_1.jsp?cid=1865073

Seoul Metropolitan Subway stations
Railway stations opened in 2022
Metro stations in Dongjak District